Dharanboodhoo (Dhivehi: ދަރަނބޫދޫ) is one of the inhabited islands of Faafu Atoll.

Geography

Demography

References

Islands of the Maldives